The United Nations Educational, Scientific and Cultural Organization (UNESCO) World Heritage Sites are places of importance to cultural or natural heritage as described in the UNESCO World Heritage Convention, established in 1972.

There are 33 UNESCO World Heritage Sites in the United Kingdom and the British Overseas Territories. The UNESCO list contains one designated site in both England and Scotland (the Frontiers of the Roman Empire) plus eighteen exclusively in England, five in Scotland, four in Wales, one in Northern Ireland, and one in each of the overseas territories of Bermuda, Gibraltar, the Pitcairn Islands, and Saint Helena. There is an additional site partly in the UK territory of Akrotiri and Dhekelia, but is regarded to be part of Cyprus's list. The first sites in the UK to be inscribed on the World Heritage List were Giant's Causeway and Causeway Coast; Durham Castle and Cathedral; Ironbridge Gorge; Studley Royal Park including the Ruins of Fountains Abbey; Stonehenge, Avebury and Associated Sites; and the Castles and Town Walls of King Edward in Gwynedd in 1986. The latest sites to be inscribed were The Slate Landscape of Northwest Wales and Bath Spa (as a component of the Great Spas of Europe) in July 2021.

The constitution of the United Nations Educational, Scientific and Cultural Organization (commonly referred to as UNESCO) was ratified in 1946 by 26 countries, including the UK. Its purpose was to provide for the "conservation and protection of the world’s inheritance of books, works of art and monuments of history and science". The UK contributes £130,000 annually to the World Heritage Fund which finances the preservation of sites in developing countries. Some designated properties contain multiple sites that share a common geographical location or cultural heritage.

The United Kingdom National Commission for UNESCO advises the British government, which is responsible for maintaining its World Heritage Sites, on policies regarding UNESCO. The UK National Commission for UNESCO conducted research in 2014–15 on the Wider Value of UNESCO to the UK, and found that the UK's World Heritage Sites generated an estimated £85 million from April 2014 to March 2015 through their association with the global network.

World Heritage Site selection criteria i–vi are culturally related, and selection criteria vii–x are the natural criteria. Twenty-three properties are designated as "cultural", four as "natural", and one as "mixed". The breakdown of sites by type was similar to the overall proportions; of the 1,121 sites on the World Heritage List, 77.5% are cultural, 19% are natural, and 3.5% are mixed. St Kilda is the only mixed World Heritage Site in the UK. Originally preserved for its natural habitats alone, the site was expanded in 2005 to include the crofting community that once inhabited the archipelago; the site became one of only 25 mixed sites worldwide. The natural sites are the Dorset and East Devon Coast; Giant's Causeway and Causeway Coast; Gough and Inaccessible Islands; and Henderson Island. The rest are cultural.

In 2012, the World Heritage Committee added Liverpool – Maritime Mercantile City to the List of World Heritage in Danger, citing threats to the site's integrity from planned urban development projects. The site was stripped of World Heritage status in 2021.

Location of sites
The UNESCO list contains one designated site in both England and Scotland (the Frontiers of the Roman Empire, which is also in Germany) with another sixteen in England, five in Scotland, four in Wales, one in Northern Ireland, and one in each of the overseas territories of Bermuda, Gibraltar, the Pitcairn Islands, and Tristan da Cunha.  The maps below show all current World Heritage Sites.

List of sites
The table lists information about each World Heritage Site:
Name: as listed by the World Heritage Committee
Location: in one of the UK's constituent countries and overseas territories, with co-ordinates provided by UNESCO
Period: time period of significance, typically of construction
UNESCO data: the site's reference number, the year the site was inscribed on the World Heritage List, and the criteria it was listed under
Description: brief description of the site

Site not regarded as part of UK list
In addition, one world heritage site falling within the Sovereign Base Areas of Akrotiri and Dhekelia is regarded as a site of Cyprus. This is as the 1960 treaty with Cyprus stipulates that "the ancient monuments and antiquity will be administered and maintained by the Republic of Cyprus".

Tentative list
The Tentative List is an inventory of important heritage and natural sites that a country is considering for inscription on the World Heritage List, thereby becoming World Heritage Sites. The Tentative List can be updated at any time, but inclusion on the list is a prerequisite to being considered for inscription within a five- to ten-year period.

The UK's Tentative List was last updated on 25 July 2014, and consisted of 11 sites. The properties on the Tentative List are as follows:

Former UNESCO World Heritage Site

See also
 List of World Heritage Sites in Europe
 List of World Heritage Sites in Scotland
 Lists of World Heritage Sites
 Tourism in the United Kingdom

Notes

References
Citations

Bibliography

External links
 UNESCO site
 Conservation of historic buildings and monuments portal
 List of World Heritage Sites in Britain

 
UNESCO World Heritage Sites
United Kingdom
World Heritage Sites